Darreh Mahi Sofla (also Romanized as Darreh Māhī Soflá and Darreh Māhī-ye Soflá; also known as Darreh Māhī-ye Pā’īn and Darreh Māhī-ye Pā‘īn) is a village in Pishkuh-e Zalaqi Rural District, Besharat District, Aligudarz County, Lorestan Province, Iran. At the 2006 census, its population was 119, in 22 families.

References 

Towns and villages in Aligudarz County